Catenoleimus is a prehistoric bird genus from the Late Cretaceous. It lived during the mid-late Turonian stage, around 90 million years ago. A single species Catenoleimus anachoretus has been described, and this is only known from one piece of coracoid (specimen PO 4606), found in the Bissekty Formation of the Kyzyl Kum in present-day Uzbekistan.

This bird appears to be a mid-sized enantiornithine, perhaps 20–25 cm long in life. The morphology of the bone is rather plesiomorphic compared to contemporary Enantiornithes.

References

Bibliography 
  (2004): The Theropod Database: Phylogeny of taxa. Retrieved 2013-MAR-02.
 Panteleyev, A.V. (1998) New species of enantiornithines (Aves: Enantiornithes) from the Upper Cretaceous of central Kyzylkum. Russkii Ornitologicheskii Zhurnal Ekspress Vypusk 35:3-15.

Bissekty Formation
Euenantiornitheans
Fossils of Uzbekistan
Fossil taxa described in 1998
Late Cretaceous birds of Asia
Prehistoric bird genera
Turonian life